Year 1152 (MCLII) was a leap year starting on Tuesday (link will display the full calendar) of the Julian calendar.

Events 
 By place 

 Levant 
 Spring – King Baldwin III and his mother, Queen Melisende, are called to intervene in a dispute between Baldwin's aunt Hodierna and her husband Raymond II, count of Tripoli. Hodierna decides to take a long holiday, and travels to Jerusalem, while Raymond escorts her out on the road southwards. On the way back to Tripoli, a group of Assassins stabs him to death at the southern gate of the city. The garrison rushes to arms and pours into the streets, slaying every Muslim in their way, but the Assassins manage to escape; the motive of their act is never known. 
 Baldwin III demands more authority and blames Manasses, ruler of Ramla, for interfering with his legal succession as ruler of Jerusalem. He demands a second coronation from Patriarch Fulcher separated from Melisende. Fulcher refuses, and as a kind of self-coronation Baldwin parades through the city streets with laurel wreaths on his head. Before the High Court (Haute Cour) the decision is made to divide the kingdom into two districts.
 Baldwin III begins a civil war against Melisende and launches an invasion in the south. He captures the castle of Mirabel, which is defended by Manasses. Baldwin spares his life and is exiled, Nablus thereupon surrenders soon after. Melisende seeks refuge in the Tower of David with her younger son, the 16-year-old Amalric. Baldwin enters Jerusalem, he allows his mother to retain Nablus and the neighbourhood as her dower.
 Summer – Nur al-Din, Seljuk ruler (atabeg) of Aleppo, re-captures most of Crusader territory in the Orontes Valley – reducing the Principality of Antioch to little more than a narrow coastal strip along the Mediterranean. The County of Tripoli remains unchanged and Jerusalem remains a potential threat with ambitions to expand eastward, while also striving to dominate the Fatimid Caliphate in Egypt.

 Europe 
 February 15 – King Conrad III dies after a 14-year reign at Bamberg. He is succeeded by his 29-year-old nephew Frederick I (Barbarossa), duke of Swabia, who is crowned as King of the Germans at Aachen several days later, on March 9. Frederick becomes sole ruler of Germany and receives the royal insignia, despite the fact that Conrad has a 6-year-old son, Frederick IV, who becomes duke of Swabia.
 March 21 – King Louis VII repudiates his marriage to Eleanor of Aquitaine and has it annulled on grounds of misconduct and consanguinity – returning her lands and titles. Within 6 weeks, Eleanor re-marries Henry of Anjou, who had claimed the counties of Anjou and Maine, and the province of Touraine upon the death of his father Geoffrey Plantagenet (the Fair), the previous year. With the addition of Eleanor's lands, he now controls territory stretching unbroken, from Cherbourg to Bayonne.
 The town of Gorodets, located on the banks of the Volga River, is founded by Yuri Dolgorukiy, Grand Prince of Kiev.

 England 
 April 6 – King Stephen has his nobles swear fealty to his son Eustace, as the rightful heir of the English throne. Theobald, archbishop of Canterbury, and other bishops refuse to crown Eustace favouring Henry of Anjou to claim the throne instead. Stephen confiscates their property and Theobald is forced into exile in Flanders.
 Stephen besieges Newbury Castle and holds the young William as a hostage to ensure that his father, John Marshal, keeps his promise to surrender the castle. When John refuses to comply, Stephen threatened to have the young boy catapulted over the walls. After this, William remains a crown hostage for many months.

 Africa 
 The Almohad Caliphate conquers the Maghrib al-Awsat (modern Algeria). The city of Béjaïa becomes one of the main naval bases of the Almohads.

 Mesoamerica 
 Matlacohuatl becomes ruler of the city-state Azcapotzalco located in the Valley of Mexico (until 1222).

 By topic 

 Religion 
 Synod of Kells-Mellifont: The present diocesan system of Ireland is established (with later modifications), and the primacy of Armagh is recognized.
 The Archbishopric of Nidaros in the city of Nidaros (modern-day Trondheim) in Norway is established.

Births 
 May 4 – Peter of Aragon, Spanish nobleman (d. 1164)
 May 10 – Gangjong, Korean ruler of Goryeo (d. 1213)
 David of Scotland, Scottish prince (d. 1219)
 Diego López II, Spanish nobleman (d. 1214)
 Geoffrey, illegitimate son of Henry II (d. 1212)
 Han Tuozhou, Chinese statesman (d. 1207)
 Imai Kanehira, Japanese general (d. 1184)
 James of Avesnes, French nobleman (d. 1191)
 Maria Komnene, Byzantine princess (d. 1182)
 Patrick I, Scottish nobleman (approximate date)
 Roger IV, duke of Apulia and Calabria (d. 1161)
 Roman Mstislavich, Kievan prince (d. 1205)
 Taira no Tomomori, Japanese nobleman (d. 1185)

Deaths 
 January 8 – Conrad I, German nobleman (b. 1090)
 January 18 – Albero de Montreuil, German archbishop 
 February 15 – Conrad III, king of Italy and Germany 
 May 3 – Matilda of Boulogne, queen of England
 June 12 – Henry of Scotland, Scottish nobleman
 August 1 – Albrecht I, German bishop of Meissen
 September 13 – Ghiyath ad-Din Mas'ud, Seljuk sultan 
 October 12 – Adolf III, count Berg and Hövel (b. 1080)
 October 14 – Ralph I (or Raoul), French nobleman
 October 24 – Jocelin of Soissons, French theologian 
 November 13 – William of St. Barbe, Norman bishop
 Adelard of Bath, English philosopher (b. 1080)
 Gilbert FitzRichard de Clare, 1st Earl of Hertford
 Nicholas IV, patriarch of Constantinople (b. 1070)
 Raymond II (or Raimundus), count of Tripoli 
 Robert of Selby, English governor and chancellor
 Theobald II (the Great), French nobleman (b. 1090)
 Theophanes Kerameus, Italian bishop (b. 1129)
 Thethmar (or Theodemar), German missionary
 Volodymyrko Volodarovych, Galician prince (b. 1104)

References